, sometimes referred to as , is a 1997 remake of the 1967 series of the same name (aired as Speed Racer in the U.S.) by Tatsunoko Productions, the original producers. The show aired in Japan in 1997 on TV Tokyo and lasted only 34 episodes of a planned 52.

In 1998, Speed Racer Enterprises planned to release an English dub of the series in the United States as Speed Racer Y2K, though the project did not succeed and only the third episode, "Silver Phantom", was dubbed.

Another English adaptation, Speed Racer X, was produced by DIC Entertainment Corporation and aired in the United States on Nickelodeon's short-lived action block, "SLAM!", in 2002. This show was quickly taken off the air (with only 13 episodes dubbed) due to a lawsuit between DiC Entertainment and the Santa Monica-based Speed Racer Enterprises, the company which owned the American rights to the franchise at the time.

The series got a Blu-ray release in Japan on April 21, 2017. Funimation released the series under the name Mach Go Go Go: Restart with English subtitles.

Differences from the original series
In this version, Rex Racer does not run away, but is presumed dead after an accident while testing out the Mach 5. His father, Pops, later rebuilds the Mach 5 with a new safety system called "Safety Seven", seven functions built into the car to protect the driver, marked by the letters A through G on the steering wheel. Rex's younger brother and Pops' second son, Speed, decides to follow up on his brother's footsteps. Trixie appears in this series as a reporter who befriends Speed, with Spritle being her younger brother (as opposed to being Speed's younger brother in the original).

There are also differences that exist even in the original Japanese version. Aside from Gō's different surname (Hibiki), other characters were replaced entirely, but have similar roles. For instance, Mai Kazami is the "Michi Shimura" (the original Trixie) of this series, with her younger brother Wataru representing "Kurio Mifune" (the original Spritle). Although Pops is still called Daisuke, Mom Racer (Aya Mifune in the original) is now known as Misuzu. In Episode 20, a baby gorilla named Rocky joins the cast, taking the role that in the original series was held by Sanpei, or Chim-Chim in the English dub. Sabu, Pops' apprentice mechanic and friend to Go in the original series has been replaced by Takumi, who has the same role. The English dub uses the same names from the original Speed Racer English dub, though the family's team is still called "Hibiki Motors".

The first 21 episodes form a story arc focusing on the Earth Grand Prix and the events leading up to it. The next 13 episodes formed a new story arc involving time traveling. When the Mach 5 hits 555 km/h, it sends Speed and his friends to the year 2555 where the world is ruled by a blue-skinned alien named Handler, who plans to use a device called the Ezekiel Wheel to rule time.

Voice cast

Japanese
Kōichi Tōchika - 
Kazusa Murai - 
Motoko Kumai - 
Minoru Inaba - 
Yōko Sōmi - 
Toshiyuki Morikawa - /
Kaneto Shiozawa -

English
Dave Wittenberg - Speed Racer
Dan Woren - Pops Racer
Tifanie Christun - Trixie, Spritle
Michelle Ruff - Mom Racer
Joshua Seth - Sparky
Richard Epcar - Racer X/Rex Racer

Episodes

Other media
A two-volume manga adaptation was published on CoroCoro Comic in 1997. It is a kodomo manga aimed at a younger audience.

A video game based on the series was developed by TOSE and published by Tomy Corporation, exclusively in Japan for the Game Boy. The game also has Super Game Boy support.

References

External links
Anime Admirers

Speed Racer
1997 anime television series debuts
Japanese children's animated action television series
Japanese children's animated adventure television series
Japanese children's animated sports television series
Action anime and manga
Funimation
Shōnen manga
Tatsunoko Production
Television series by DIC Entertainment
Television series by DHX Media
TV Tokyo original programming
Animated television series reboots
Animated television series about auto racing
TV5 (Philippine TV network) original programming